Nasikya was a kingdom mentioned in the epic Mahabharata. During the time of Ramayana this place was a forest and was known as Panchavati. It was here that Raghava Rama, Lakshmana and Sita spent their period of exile from their kingdom Kosala into the woods.

See also 
Kingdoms of Ancient India

References 
Mahabharata of Krishna Dwaipayana Vyasa, translated to English by Kisari Mohan Ganguli

External links

Kingdoms in the Mahabharata